Shorea seminis is a species of tree in the family Dipterocarpaceae. It is native to Borneo and Palawan.

Diptoindonesin A is a C-glucoside of ε-viniferin isolated from S. seminis.

See also
 List of Shorea species

References

seminis
Trees of Borneo
Trees of the Philippines
Taxonomy articles created by Polbot